The Ca' da Mosto is a 13th-century, Venetian-Byzantine style palace, the oldest on the Grand Canal, located between the Rio dei Santi Apostoli and the Palazzo Bollani Erizzo, in the sestiere of Cannaregio in Venice, Italy. Today, it is home to the Venice Venice Hotel.

Architecture

The palace has high narrow arches and distinctive capitals. The features show its beginnings as a casa-fondaco, the home and workplace of its original merchant owner. A second floor was added at the beginning of the sixteenth century, and a third in the nineteenth. The central part of the first floor is decorated with a wide heptafora with leftmost opening currently closed up.

History
The palace dates from the early 13th-century, and takes its name from the Venetian da Mosto family, the most famous of whom was Alvise Cadamosto, an Italian explorer who worked with slave traders in Portugal, and who was born in the palace in 1432. It stayed in the da Mosto family until 1603, when Chiara da Mosto left her entire estate to Leonardo Donà dalle Rose of the Donà family, a nephew of her second husband, rather than to her da Mosto relatives, with whom she had fallen out.

Between the 16th and the 18th centuries the Ca' da Mosto housed the well-known Albergo Leon Bianco (the White Lion Hotel). In 1769 and 1775 the Holy Roman Emperor and son of Maria Theresa, Joseph II, lived here during his stay in Venice.

Present day
The Ca' da Mosto sat empty for decades prior to 2019, with the high waters of the canal having breached its basement. According to an interview in The Lady, the palace is admired by Francesco da Mosto, a descendant of its eponymous former owners, and is the Venetian building he would most like to see restored.

The Ca' da Mosto has since undergone a €3 million restoration, followed by an €8.7 million investment intended to transform the palace into the luxury Venice Venice Hotel. Beginning in January 2019, renovation works were originally scheduled for completion in 2020, but the COVID-19 pandemic delayed the hotel's opening until February 2022.

See also
Palazzo Falier, also one of the oldest Venetian buildings.

Sources
Francesco da Mosto, Francesco's Venice (London: BBC, 2004)

External links
Official site of hotel

References

Da Mosto
Da Mosto
Buildings and structures completed in the 13th century
Medieval Italian architecture